Marion Milner (1900–1998), sometimes known as Marion Blackett-Milner, was a British writer and psychoanalyst. Outside psychotherapeutic circles, she is better known by her pseudonym, Joanna Field, as a pioneer of introspective journaling.

Biography
Milner was born in Kensington, London, as Nina Marion Blackett, the daughter of Arthur Stuart Blackett, a stockbroker, and his wife, Caroline Frances Maynard. She was the sister of Nobel physicist Patrick Blackett. She studied at University College, London, where she graduated with a 1st Class degree in psychology in 1924. 

In 1926, Milner began an introspective journey that later became one of her best-known books, A Life of One's Own (initially published under the name Joanna Field in 1934). This started as a journal in which she would note down times that she felt happy and thoughts going through her head at those times, in an attempt to discover what happiness was; however, her introspection branched out into other areas, from an analysis of day-to-day worries to experiences which some reviewers described as "mystical". Milner's basic technique is a kind of introspection, observing fleeting thoughts ("butterfly thoughts", as she calls them) combined with an openness to sensory experience that she calls "wide awareness". A Life of One's Own was well-received, attracting favorable reviews from such literary notables as W. H. Auden and Stephen Spender, and soon afterwards, she published a work on similar lines (again as Joanna Field), An Experiment in Leisure.

During this period, Milner became increasingly interested in Jean Piaget and the work of Jungian analytical psychologists. Here she was particularly interested in what she originally termed "bisexuality", but would now perhaps be better called psychological androgyny, and also investigated Eastern philosophies such as Taoism. In 1940, she started training as a psychoanalyst undergoing analysis with Sylvia Payne, and training with Joan Riviere and Ella Sharpe. She began practicing psychoanalysis in 1943, and became a prominent member of the Independent Group. Her best-known work on psychoanalysis, The Hands of the Living God, relates her own lengthy treatment of a psychotic patient and the insights she gained into her own mind. She made considerable use of painting and doodling in her therapy and was also an enthusiastic painter herself; her observations on the benefits of painting were published as On Not Being Able to Paint.

Milner married Dennis Milner in 1927; they had one son named John.  Dennis died in 1954.  Milner died in London on 29 May 1998.

Publications
A Life of One's Own 1934
An Experiment in Leisure 1937The Human Problem in Schools 1938On Not Being Able to Paint 1950The Hands of the Living God 1969
 Eternitys Sunrise 1987
 The Suppressed Madness of Sane Men: Forty-Four Years of Exploring Psychoanalysis 1987
 Eternity's Sunrise. A Way of Keeping a Diary 1987
 Bothered by Alligators'' 2012

See also
 Writing therapy
 List of books on diaries and journals

References

External links
Michael Brearley: "Obituary: Marion Milner" The Independent June 10, 1998
Kelley A. Raab: Creativity and Transcendence in the Work of Marion Milner
Women Psychoanalysts in Great Britain: Marion Milner

1900 births
1998 deaths
British psychoanalysts
Analysands of D. W. Winnicott
Alumni of University College London